Mayang Imphal is a town and municipal council in Imphal West district in the Indian state of Manipur. Pin code of Mayang Imphal is 795132.

Geography
On the southwest, there is the Loktak lake, the largest fresh water lake in the northeast India.

Demographics
 India census, Mayang Imphal had a population of 20,536. Males constitute 50% of the population and females 50%. Mayang Imphal has an average literacy rate of 56%, lower than the national average of 59.5%: male literacy is 67%, and female literacy is 45%. In Mayang Imphal, 17% of the population is under 6 years of age. The population comprises different religions such as the Hindus, Muslims (also called the Meitei Pangal), the Meitei Ancient Religion, and Christians.

Politics
Mayang Imphal is part of the Lok Sabha constituency of Inner Manipur and it is the 23rd constituency of Manipur Legislative Assembly.

References

Cities and towns in Imphal West district